Westminster Park is both a suburb to the west of Chester in England, and a large park the area takes its name after. Chester residents do not consider the area as a part of the Lache (an adjacent suburb consisting largely of council housing) although the main route through Westminster Park is Lache Lane. In any case it can sometimes be difficult to tell where one suburb ends and another begins.

Park

The park was awarded Green Flag status, meaning it is safe, welcoming and well maintained. It contains a nine-hole golf course, municipal and private tennis courts, bowling greens, a cricket pitch, football pitches, a croquet pitch and a children's play area.

Suburb

There is a shopping complex in Westminster Park. Some of the shops are a Co-op, a delicatessen, hairdresser, beauty salon, a Chinese takeaway, fish and chip shop, a pharmacy, a greengrocer, and a florist.

Westminster Park has a gymnasium nearby which is part of The Nuffield group. The sports complex is next to the Chester Tennis Club and The Nuffield Hospital on the Wrexham Road.

Just to the south is Chester Business Park, a large, out-of-town office complex for, among others, MBNA and M&S Money.

Kings Moat development

In January 2019, a new 1,300 home site was approved to the south of Westminster Park, to be built by Redrow and Taylor Wimpey over a period of 14 years. The site will contain a shopping centre with a supermarket, restaurant and pub, as well as a nursery, outdoor play area and primary school with playing fields. The developers will pay £2 million to ensure that the nearby GP surgeries in Handbridge and the Lache are able to take the additional patients from the new estate. 30% of the homes will be affordable. Preparatory work started in August 2019 and housebuilding started in November 2019, ready for the first homes to be completed in early 2021.

Politics

Local Government
Westminster Park forms part of the Cheshire West and Chester council area.

British Parliament
Westminster Park is in the City of Chester parliamentary constituency and is represented by Samantha Dixon, who has held the seat since December 2022.

References

External links
www.wp-ra.org.uk residents association website
www.westminsterpark.org.uk website for the park at Westminster Park
www.chesterweather.org.uk Westminster Park's amateur weather station

Areas of Chester